The Kerguelen hotspot is a volcanic hotspot at the Kerguelen Plateau in the Southern Indian Ocean. The Kerguelen hotspot has produced basaltic lava for about 130 million years and has also produced the Kerguelen Islands, Naturaliste Plateau, Heard Island, the McDonald Islands, the Ninety East Ridge and Rajmahal Traps.

References

Hotspots of the Indian Ocean
Geography of the Kerguelen Islands